Shek O Country Park is a rural marine park located on Shek O, Southern District, Hong Kong and facing the South China Sea. The 701-hectare park opened on 21 September 1979.

Urban hiking is extremely popular here, there are three exceptional hiking trails, one of which Time Magazine Asia declared the best urban hiking trail in Asia, the Dragon's Back.

The spider species Uroballus carlei was discovered at this park.

Features
The park's attractions include:
Pottinger Peak
Mount Collinson
Wan Cham Shan
Dragon's Back, including Shek O Peak
D'Aguilar Peak
Hong Kong Trail
To Tei Wan Village
Shek O Beach

See also
 D'Aguilar Peninsula

References

External links

Shek O Country Park

Country parks and special areas of Hong Kong
Southern District, Hong Kong
1979 establishments in Hong Kong